Charles Eduard McIntosh (April 13, 1838 – July 26, 1915) was a member of the Wisconsin State Assembly and a Union Army soldier.

Biography
McIntosh was born on April 13, 1838 in Goderich, Canada West. He moved to what is now New Berlin, Wisconsin in 1840 before attending the University of Notre Dame. During the American Civil War, he served with the Union Army. On October 11, 1864, McIntosh married Mary E. Conklin. They had six children. McIntosh moved to Appleton, Wisconsin in 1866 and to Florence, Wisconsin in 1881.

On June 12, 1884 McIntosh was arrested for shooting Sheriff James E. Readmon in Florence. He moved to Iron Mountain, Michigan in September 1884. The 1910 census listed him as an inmate at the Wisconsin Veterans Home in Waupaca, Wisconsin. He died in 1915 and is buried at Wisconsin Veterans Memorial Cemetery in King, Wisconsin.

Political career
McIntosh was a member of the Assembly during the 1869, 1870 and 1871 sessions. After he was defeated in the 1871 election, he was arrested for assaulting the local judge in charge of election returns, Samuel Ryan, Jr. Later, he became District Attorney of Florence County, Wisconsin. He was a Democrat.

References

External links

People from Goderich, Ontario
Pre-Confederation Ontario people
People from New Berlin, Wisconsin
Politicians from Appleton, Wisconsin
People from Florence, Wisconsin
Democratic Party members of the Wisconsin State Assembly
District attorneys in Wisconsin
University of Notre Dame alumni
People of Wisconsin in the American Civil War
Union Army soldiers
1838 births
1915 deaths